Diego Junqueira was the defending champion, but he chose not to play this year.
Kevin Anderson won in the final 2–6, 6–2, 7–5, against Blaž Kavčič.

Seeds

Draw

Final four

Top half

Bottom half

References
 Main Draw
 Qualifying Draw

Sanremo Tennis Cup - Singles
Sanremo Tennis Cup